Cefalonium (INN) is a first-generation cephalosporin antibiotic.

References 

Cephalosporin antibiotics
Isonicotinamides
Thiophenes
Pyridinium compounds